PostModern MTV was a program in the late 1980s and very early 1990s on MTV, originally hosted by Kevin Seal and later by Dave Kendall featuring such postpunk, ebm, alternative artists as PIL, The Cure, Depeche Mode, Front 242, Midnight Oil, New Order, The Jesus and Mary Chain, INXS, They Might Be Giants, Skinny Puppy, Siouxsie and The Banshees, Front Line Assembly, Sinead O'Connor, and Love and Rockets. The show also featured interviews with guest musicians and aired Monday through Thursday from 23:30 to midnight as a precursor to 120 Minutes, with an emphasis on underground music.

After the departure of the original host, a reworked program entitled Alternative Nation was introduced, which followed a similar format and feel.

The MTV Europe Edition of the PostModern show was hosted by Pip Dann in the 1990s.

MTV original programming
Alternative rock
1980s American music television series
1990s American music television series